Jiella  is a genus of bacteria from the family of Aurantimonadaceae with one known species (Jiella aquimaris).

References

Monotypic bacteria genera
Hyphomicrobiales
Bacteria genera